Inon Zur (born July 4, 1965) is an Israeli-American composer. Originally writing for movies and television, he later moved into composing for video games. He has been described as being "internationally recognized as one of the A-list orchestral composers in the video games industry". Zur has composed the music to over 50 video games, 15 television shows, and 10 films, as well as film trailers. He has been nominated for numerous awards, and has won three—a Telly Award in 1997 for Best Score on Power Rangers: Turbo, a Game Audio Network Guild award in 2004 for Best Original Instrumental track for Men of Valor, and a Hollywood Music in Media Award in 2009 for Best Original Song – Video Game for Dragon Age: Origins.

Biography

Early life 
Inon Zur was born in Israel. At the age of five, he was trying to compose harmonies with his mother's singing, and became inspired by classical music. He learned to play French horn as a child, studied piano by the age of eight, and was studying composition by the age of ten. He graduated from the Music Academy of Tel Aviv, and spent four years in the Israeli military. He emigrated to the United States in 1990 to study at the Dick Grove School of Music for a year, and then under private tutor Jack Smalley, a television music composer, and others for two years at the University of California, Los Angeles.

Career 
Zur began his career in 1994 by working on soundtracks for movies, such as Yellow Lotus, featured at the Sundance Film Festival. He signed on to compose for Fox Family for six years, and made soundtracks for various children's television shows, including Digimon and Power Rangers. By 2002, he estimated that he had composed the soundtrack to over 360 Power Rangers episodes. He won his first award during this period in his career, a Telly Award for his work on Power Rangers: Turbo. While he enjoyed the work, he began to want to go work somewhere "more intriguing, more advanced, and basically a place that people really appreciate music more"; his agent overcame his initial reluctance and convinced him to work in the video games industry. His first video game soundtrack was 2000's Star Trek: Klingon Academy, which he started composing for the game in 1997. Zur moved on to prestigious titles, composing for the award-winning and critically acclaimed Baldur's Gate II: Throne of Bhaal in 2001 and Icewind Dale II in 2002, among many others. Icewind Dale II earned him the first of many nominations for video game music awards, that of the Game Audio Network Guild's Music of the Year award. He continued to work on movies and television programs during these years, composing the soundtrack to Au Pair in 1999 and the English version of the 2000 anime series Escaflowne.

Zur's latest movie soundtrack to date was that of 2001's Au Pair II. He has worked on a few television series since then; his last traditional television soundtrack was for The Bachelor in 2002, though he has composed music for three webisode series since then. He continued to work on numerous video games, including Prince of Persia: The Two Thrones in 2005 and Crysis in 2007. He has garnered several nominations for video game music awards, including his first win, for Men of Valor in the Best Original Instrumental track category of the 2004 Game Audio Network Guild awards. His latest released titles have been Fallout 3 and Prince of Persia in 2008, Dragon Age: Origins and the Nintendo DS version of James Cameron's Avatar: The Game in 2009, Fallout: New Vegas in 2010, and Fallout 4 in 2015. His work on Dragon Age: Origins has earned Zur his third career award, that of Best Original Song – Video Game for "I Am the One" in the 2009 Hollywood Music In Media Awards.

Zur penned the original musical score for The Lord of the Rings: War in the North video game, conducting and recording with the London Philharmonia Orchestra and the Pinewood Singers Choir at the legendary Abbey Road Studios in London. In an industry first, a dedicated concert of his music from War in the North was performed each evening at the 2011 Electronic Entertainment Expo (E3) in Los Angeles. The one-hour concert series was conducted by Zur and performed by The Hollywood Orchestra and Choir with the participation of The Lyris Quartet and solos from celebrated vocalist Aubrey Ashburn.

Performances 
Zur's compositions have been played several times in live concerts. The first of these was a concert held in Seoul, South Korea, on May 30, 2006, dedicated to his music for Lineage II: Chronicle V: Oath of Blood. On August 20, 2008, music from his soundtrack to Crysis was played in Leipzig, Germany, at a Video Games Live concert. His music from Dragon Age: Origins and Prince of Persia was performed at the September 26, 2009 "A Night in Fantasia 2009" concert in Sydney, Australia, by the Eminence Symphony Orchestra. Zur was a special guest at the concert.

Musical style and influences 
Zur's compositions frequently are focused on full orchestras, choir and, in some games like Prince of Persia, ethnic instruments like Arabic flutes and the woodwind duduk. He has often collaborated with the Northwest Sinfonia orchestra from Seattle, though he has on occasion used other orchestras. Whenever Zur works with a real orchestra, he always conducts it himself. He has named some of his musical influences as classical artists such as Sergey Prokofiev, Igor Stravinsky, and Beethoven, movie composers like John Williams and Jerry Goldsmith, and jazz artists like George Gershwin and Henry McFeeny. While he would one day like to compose music not intended to be part of a larger piece of media, he finds that the pressure of a deadline and the feedback from the developers are crucial in his development process. He feels that his music sounds best when it is in the context given by the media it was made for, though he feels that performances of the music by itself transforms it "from just a soundtrack to an art form on its own". Zur sometimes collaborates with other musicians while composing his game soundtracks; for example, he worked with Florence and the Machine to create a unique rendition of "I'm Not Calling You A Liar" for the Dragon Age II soundtrack.

Zur typically is brought in to compose for a game once it is mostly complete, though he notes that that is earlier than for films and television—where nothing changes after he starts besides post-production effects—making video game music composition a more "flexible" process. He finds that it is "crucial" for him to play a game before he can compose music for it, even if it only a development version. Rather than compose music based around the setting in the game where it will be played, Zur composes music around the emotion that he wants the player to feel at that point in the game. While he feels that music composition technology has come far enough in recent years to no longer be a limiting factor in his music, he does feel that the music budgets for games limit what he can create. Zur feels that he is considered in the industry to be a very fast composer, which he attributes to his tendency to compose music "intuitively", rather than spending a lot of time planning it out. When not composing, Zur likes to play video games, especially those he has composed for, as well as play basketball and spend time with his family. The types of projects that he would like to work on in the future that he has not yet done are children's games and soundtracks incorporating jazz music.

Works

Films

Television

Video games

Awards and nominations

References

External links 
 
 

1965 births
American film score composers
American male film score composers
American television composers
Fallout (series) developers
Israeli emigrants to the United States
Living people
Male television composers
UCLA School of the Arts and Architecture alumni
Video game composers